

Series

Performance

ODI

Batting Performance

Most Runs

Bowling Performance

Fixture and Result

ODI

India in international cricket